Kodak Pixpro is a production series of Kodak cameras, it may refer to:
 Kodak Pixpro S-1
 Kodak PixPro AZ521